Guanche mummy of Madrid or Guanche mummy of Barranco de Herques, is a mummy of an ancient Guanche individual, which is now on display at the National Archaeological Museum of Spain in Madrid, Spain.
The mummy is a male Guanche in an excellent state of preservation. Is believed to date from the twelfth and thirteenth centuries AD, and belongs to a man between 30 and 34 years and, according to experts, would be the best Guanche preserved mummy in the world. The individual in question, has all his teeth very well preserved, without any wear and tear, has "caucusian features" (including brown red hair) and his hands that do not reveal that he had done hard physical work. On the part of the Computerized axial tomography (CT) that was made to this mummy revealed that the viscera were not removed to mummify it and that in fact, it conserves the brain, which contradicts some historical Castilian chronicles that tell how was the mummification process between the Guanches.

The mummy was found in Barranco de Herques, in the south of Tenerife, between the towns of Fasnia and Güímar. He arrived in Madrid in the eighteenth century as a gift to King Charles III of Spain. It was initially placed in the Royal Library and subsequently in the National Museum of Anthropology. The mummy participated in the Universal Exhibition of Paris of 1878.

Since December 2015, the mummy was moved definitively National Archaeological Museum of Spain. The mummy, is the centerpiece of the space dedicated to the Canarian prehistory of the museum.

Since 1976, both the Government of the Canary Islands and the Cabildo de Tenerife have unsuccessfully bid a number of times for the return of the mummy to Tenerife.

Mummy data 
 Gender: male.
 Age: 30 to 34 years or so.
 Culture: Guanche.
 Type of mummification: ceremonial mummy.
 Type of burial: burial cave.
 Location: Barranco Herques between the current municipalities of Fasnia and Güímar.
 Shown at: The National Archaeological Museum of Spain.
 Interesting facts: is considered the best Guanche mummy found to date.

See also 
Guanche mummies of Necochea
National Archaeological Museum of Spain

References 

Guanche mummies
Collection of the National Archaeological Museum, Madrid
Guanche people
Archaeological discoveries in Spain